John Stanford (1537–1603) was an English politician.

He was the eldest son of Thomas Stanford, Mayor of Leicester.

He was made a Freeman of Leicester in 1558, chamberlain in 1565, coroner in 1573–74 and mayor in 1576–77 and 1592–93. He was elected a Member (MP) of the Parliament of England for Leicester in 1572 and 1593.

He married as his second wife Elizabeth, the daughter of John Heyrick, with whom he had 4 sons and a daughter. He was succeeded by his son John.

References

 

1537 births
1603 deaths
English MPs 1572–1583
English MPs 1593
Mayors of places in Leicestershire